Edwin Henry Cheney (June 13, 1869 - December 18, 1942) was an American electrical engineer from Oak Park, Illinois, United States.

Edwin was the son of James Wilson Cheney (b. August 20, 1841) and Armilla Armanda (b. ca. 1846), daughter of Linus S. and Rebekah J. (Jaegger) Perkins. His father was born in Royalton, MA, and moved to Maine with his parents ca. 1850. James W. entered Oberlin College in 1860 before enlisting in the 7th Ohio Infantry in April 1861. After his marriage to Armilla Perkins on May 27, 1868, he moved from Shelbyville, IL, to Detroit, MI, in 1870 where he engaged in manufacturing tool-handles and other specialty items. Edwin's sister, Luella Emory Cheney, was born April 11, 1871 (adopted).

Cheney became an electrical engineer. He commissioned Frank Lloyd Wright to build his family a house in Oak Park. Wright engaged in a love affair with Edwin's wife Mamah, with whom he went to Europe in 1909. Upon their return, Mamah moved into Taliesin, the new house Wright was building for them, while it was still under construction. Mamah and Edwin were divorced in 1911, and a year later Edwin married Elizabeth Meller, a schoolteacher friend of Mamah's sister Lizzie.

In 1914, Julian Carlton, a domestic servant at Taliesin, killed Mamah and her two children, John and Martha, who happened to be visiting (Edwin still had primary custody). Four others were also murdered during this event, and Carlton, following ingestion of acid in an apparent suicide attempt, died before being tried.

Edwin Cheney and his second wife had 3 more children. They later moved to Webster Groves, Missouri, where he continued to work for Wagner Electric until his death. The Edwin H. Cheney House in Oak Park is part of the Frank Lloyd Wright-Prairie School of Architecture Historic District.

An opera, Shining Brow, covers the story of the Cheneys and Wrights, from when they meet in Wright's office, through the aftermath of Mamah's death. Music by Daron Hagen and lyrics by Paul Muldoon.

Notes

References
 Frank Lloyd Wright biography by author of "The Frank Lloyd Wright Companion"
 Cheney House article from the Oak Park Tourist Website
 Frank Lloyd Wright genealogy (partial)

External links
 Shining Brow information at Daron Hagen's Website

1869 births
1942 deaths
American electrical engineers
People from Oak Park, Illinois
People from Webster Groves, Missouri
Engineers from Illinois